Sa'adat Abad ( Sa'âdat Âbâd) is a wealthy district located in northern Tehran. 
Some of the notable urban amenities located in the Sa'adat Abad district are Tehran's luxurious 5-star Espinas palace hotel, Arikeh Iranian shopping centre, Aren shopping centre, Sadaf shopping mall, Zeytoon sports complex, Tehran Jurassic park, Saadat Abad Park, Parvaz garden, Erfan hospital, Atieh hospital and Parsian hospital. 
Because of its location in the northern Tehran and its proximity to the Alborz mountains, Sa'adat Abad district is known to have better air quality and lower levels of air pollution. 

Located in Sa'adat Abad is the Tehran International School (Boys Section), located in Farhang square. The school has about two hundred students and is a registered IB (International Baccalaureate School).

See also
Evin
Velenjak
Almahdi
Punak
Tehran

References

External links
Neighborhood Community

Neighbourhoods in Tehran